Soyuz is a rural locality (a village) in Bolshegondryskoye Rural Settlement, Kuyedinsky District, Perm Krai, Russia. The population was 80 as of 2010. There is 1 street.

Geography 
Soyuz is located 18 km southwest of Kuyeda (the district's administrative centre) by road. Artaulovo is the nearest rural locality.

References 

Rural localities in Kuyedinsky District